Långe Erik ("Tall Erik"), official name Ölands norra udde, is a Swedish lighthouse built in 1845 and located on a little island, Stora Grundet (in Böda socken, Borgholm Municipality), in Grankullaviken bay at the north point of Öland, the second largest island in Sweden. The island is connected to Öland by a small bridge built in 1965.

The lighthouse is whitewashed, 32 meters high. It was designed by H. Byström and built by Jonas Jonsson. The former lighthouse keeper's house is next to the lighthouse, with a few buildings from the 1900s.

The older, larger lens is still installed, but no longer in use. The lens was used until the 1990s before an aerobeacon was installed on the lantern's balcony. The light is remote-controlled by the Swedish Maritime Administration.

The tower is permanently closed to visitors.

See also

 List of lighthouses and lightvessels in Sweden
 Långe Jan ("Tall John"), the lighthouse at the south cape of Öland.

References

External links

 Sjofartsverket  
 The Swedish Lighthouse Society
  Långe Erik fyr  

Lighthouses completed in 1845
Lighthouses in Sweden
Öland
1845 establishments in Sweden